Amigos is a 2004 play by the Australian playwright David Williamson, published by Currency Press in 2004, which premiered with the Sydney Theatre Company.

First production
Amigos was first produced by Sydney Theatre Company at the Drama Theatre, Sydney Opera House, on 8 April 2004, with the following cast:

Jim: Gary Day
Dick: Tony Llewellyn-Jones
Stephen: Garry McDonald
Hilary: Wendy Hughes
Sophie: Natasha Elisabeth Beaumont
Director: Jennifer Flowers
Set designer: Michael Scott-Mitchell
Costume designer: Fiona Crombie
Lighting designer: David Walters
Composer: Paul Charlier

References

Plays by David Williamson
2004 plays